Kurt Morsink Ramos (born June 27, 1984 in Orlando, Florida) is an American-Costa Rican retired soccer player.

Career

College and amateur
Morsink was born on June 27, 1984 in Orlando, Florida, from American father and Costa Rican mother. From childhood, he raised in  San José, Costa Rica.  Growing up, he played for Costa Rican powerhouse Alajuelense's youth system; but, he never play with the Alajuelense first team.  He was a member of the U-15 Costa Rica national team.  He joined the US U17 National team 84 age group for the residency program at IMG Academy in Bradenton Florida, although he never played an official match.  He played collegiate soccer at James Madison University from 2003 to 2006.   He started 73 out of 76 games scoring 32 goals and assisting on 29. He was an All Conference and All American as well as the National Player of the Week.  During his college years he also played with both Bradenton Academics and Cape Cod Crusaders in the USL Premier Development League.

Professional
Morsink was drafted by the Kansas City Wizards in the 4th round of the 2007 MLS SuperDraft (No. 42 overall) with their third pick. Started in all play-off games his rookie year, a team whom lost in the Western Conference Finals to eventual MLS Cup champions Houston Dynamo.  After three seasons with the club, Morsink was traded to D.C. United in February 2010. After struggling with injuries, Morsink retired from playing professional soccer on August 9, 2012.

References

External links
 

1984 births
Living people
People from Orlando, Florida
Association football midfielders
Costa Rican footballers
IMG Academy Bradenton players
James Madison Dukes men's soccer players
Sporting Kansas City players
Cape Cod Crusaders players
D.C. United players
James Madison University alumni
Major League Soccer players
USL League Two players
Sporting Kansas City draft picks